Diplocidaris is an extinct genus of sea urchins belonging to the family Diplocidaridae. The type species of this genus is Cidaris gigantea Agassiz, 1840.

These slow-moving low-level epifaunal grazer-omnivores  lived in the Jurassic period, from 161.2 to 150.8 Ma. Fossils of this genus have been found in the sediments of Europe, North Africa, Madagascar.

Species
Diplocidaris gigantea (Agassiz, 1840)
Diplocidaris besairiei Lambert, 1936
Diplocidaris jacquemonti Lambert, 1910
Diplocidaris desori Wright, 1858
Diplocidaris dumortieri Cotteau, 1863
Diplocidaris gevreyi Lambert in Savin 1902
Diplocidaris bernasconii Bischof, Hostettler & Menkveld-Gfeller, 2018

References

Diplocidaridae
Prehistoric echinoid genera
Cidaroida genera
Jurassic echinoderms
Extinct animals of Africa
Fossil taxa described in 1855